Glenburnie was launched in Prince Edward Island in 1840. She first appeared in Lloyd's Register (LR) in 1841. She traded between England and Quebec and was lost in 1843.

On 27 July 1843 Glenburnie collided with Lochlibo and foundered in the Atlantic Ocean. Her crew were rescued. She was on a voyage from Bridgwater to Quebec City. However, the entry for Glenburnie in the 1843 volume of Lloyd's Register carries the annotation "Run down".

A later article in The Times was more correct. It reported that Lochliboo had run down Glenburnie, of Bideford, on 26 July, near "Cape de Montez". Glenburnie had been carrying coal to Quebec. She sank almost immediately, but her crew was saved and brought to Bridgewater.

Citations

1840 ships
Age of Sail merchant ships of England
Ships built in Prince Edward Island
Maritime incidents in July 1843